This List of members of the American Academy of Arts and Letters Department of Music shows the members of one of the three departments of the American Academy of Arts and Letters.

After being nominated by current members, new members are selected in two elections, the first by the department they join (Art, Literature or Music). Candidates who receive the most votes in their own department are then voted on by the entire membership.

(List as of November 2006)

A
John Coolidge Adams, 1997  
Samuel Adler, 2001  
T.J. Anderson, 2005  
Dominick Argento, 1980

B
Robert Beaser, 2004  
William Bolcom, 1993  
Martin Boykan, 2011  
Martin Bresnick, 2006

C
Chou Wen-chung, 1982  
John Corigliano, 1991  
George Crumb, 1975
Sebastian Currier, 2016

D
Mario Davidovsky, 1982  
David Del Tredici, 1984

F
Carlisle Floyd, 2001

G
Philip Glass, 2003

H
John Harbison, 1992  
Stephen Hartke, 2009  
Karel Husa, 1994

J
Stephen Jaffe, 2012
Ben Johnston, 2018
Betsy Jolas, 1983

K
Aaron Jay Kernis, 2011

L
David Lang, 2014  
Paul Lansky, 2016  
Tania León, 2010
Fred Lerdahl, 2010
George E. Lewis, 2018

P
 Tobias Picker, 2012

R
David Rakowski, 2016  
Shulamit Ran, 2003  
Bernard Rands, 2004  
Steve Reich, 1994  
Ned Rorem, 1979  
Christopher Rouse, 2002
Frederic Rzewski, 2009

S
 Joseph Schwantner, 2002
 Alvin Singleton, 2014

T
Augusta Read Thomas, 2009  
Joan Tower, 1998

W
Melinda Wagner, 2017  
Julia Wolfe, 2017 
Charles Wuorinen, 1985  
Yehudi Wyner, 1999

Z
Ellen Taaffe Zwilich, 1992

Deceased members

See also
List of members of the American Academy of Arts and Letters Department of Art
List of members of the American Academy of Arts and Letters Department of Literature

External links
List of members of Department of Music of the American Academy of Arts and Letters

American Academy of Arts and Letters Department of Music, List of members of